Brendan Daly (born September 10, 1975) is an American football coach who is the linebackers coach for the Kansas City Chiefs of the National Football League (NFL). Daly previously served as a defensive line coach for the Minnesota Vikings, St. Louis Rams and New England Patriots.

Early years
Daly attended Sacred Heart-Griffin High School in Springfield, Illinois and earned his bachelor's degree in history from Drake University in Des Moines, Iowa.

Family
Daly is married to Keely Endecott Daly and has three children.

Coaching career

Ridgewood High School
In 1997, Daly received his first coaching position as an offensive and defensive line coach at Ridgewood High School in New Port Richey, Florida.

Drake
In 1998, Daly was hired as a tight ends coach at Drake, his alma mater.

Villanova
In 1999, Daly was hired as a tight ends coach at Villanova. The 1999 Wildcats went 7–4 and Talley posted his 100th victory at the school.

Maryland
In 2000, Daly was hired as an offensive graduate assistant at Maryland. This was Daly's first exposure to major Division I football and he worked with the tight ends.

Oklahoma State
In 2001, Daly was hired as a graduate assistant at Oklahoma State. Throughout his time at Oklahoma State, Daly worked on both sides of the ball. He was promoted to assistant strength and conditioning  coach in 2003.

Illinois State
In 2004, Daly was hired as a tight ends coach at Illinois State. He coached the tight ends at Division I-AA Illinois State when the Redbirds led the Gateway Conference in passing offense.

Villanova (second stint)
In 2005, Daly returned to Villanova as their defensive line coach.

Minnesota Vikings
In 2006, Daly was hired by the Minnesota Vikings to be their assistant defensive line coach.

St. Louis Rams
In 2009, Daly was hired by the St. Louis Rams to be their defensive line coach.

Minnesota Vikings (second stint)
In 2012, Daly returned to the Minnesota Vikings after he was hired to be their defensive line coach.

New England Patriots
In 2014, Daly was hired by the New England Patriots as a defensive assistant. Daly won his first Super Bowl ring when the Patriots defeated the Seattle Seahawks in Super Bowl XLIX by a score of 28–24. He was promoted to defensive line coach ahead of the 2015 season. Daly was part of the Patriots coaching staff that won Super Bowl LI on February 5, 2017. In the game, the Patriots defeated the Atlanta Falcons by a score of 34–28 in overtime.
 The Patriots made it Super Bowl LII, but were defeated by the Philadelphia Eagles 41–33. Daly won his third Super Bowl when the Patriots defeated the Los Angeles Rams 13–3 in Super Bowl LIII. It was the lowest scoring Super Bowl ever.

Kansas City Chiefs
On February 9, 2019, Daly was hired by the Kansas City Chiefs as their defensive line coach. In his first season with the Chiefs, Daly won Super Bowl LIV against the San Francisco 49ers 31–20 to give Daly his fourth Super Bowl championship. In 2020, Daly coached in his 5th straight Super Bowl, but the Chiefs lost 31–9 to the Tampa Bay Buccaneers in Super Bowl LV. Following the conclusion of the 2021 season, Daly was moved to linebackers coach. In 2022, Daly won his 5th Super Bowl ring when the Chiefs defeated the Philadelphia Eagles 38-35 in Super Bowl LVII.

References

External links
 Kansas City Chiefs bio

1975 births
Living people
Drake Bulldogs football players
Drake Bulldogs football coaches
Villanova Wildcats football coaches
Maryland Terrapins football coaches
Oklahoma State Cowboys football coaches
Illinois State Redbirds football coaches
Minnesota Vikings coaches
St. Louis Rams coaches
New England Patriots coaches
Kansas City Chiefs coaches